Joel Kissin, originally from New Zealand, is a restaurateur who was the co-founder, managing director and shareholder of Conran Restaurants (now D&D London). Kissin has been involved in opening a dozen restaurants in London and New York.

Restaurants

Kissin met Sir Terence Conran in 1986 whilst running the restaurant Hilaire. In 1987, Conran asked Kissin to join Simon Hopkinson, Hilaire's chef, to help launch Bibendum in The Michelin Building. In addition to managing the restaurant and oyster bar, Kissin created an award-winning wine list for the restaurant. After Bibendum, Kissin joined Conran at his new development in Butler's Wharf. Kissin and Conran first created Le Pont de la Tour at Butler's Wharf comprising a restaurant, bar & grill, food shop, wine merchant, oil and spice shop and bakery. 
 
Kissin and Conran then purchased the Quaglino's site and, with Conran, also opened Le Pont de la Tour (which hosted a dinner for the Blairs and the Clintons in 1997) and Cantina del Ponte next door, before Quaglino's opened on Valentine's Day 1993. The restaurant "broke the mould" in that it was the largest restaurant London had ever known. It seated 350 people, and was fully booked months before opening, remaining that way for many years. The restaurant received critical acclaim and was a leader in terms of turnover and profitability at the time. The restaurant was mentioned in the TV comedy Absolutely Fabulous, as was Le Pont de la Tour.
 
With the opening of the Butlers Wharf Chop-House in 1994, Kissin and Conran opened three restaurants in a period of 10 months, with a combined turnover of nearly £16 million.
 
In 1994, Kissin and Conran were jointly awarded a "Catey" as Best Independent Restaurateurs by The Caterer and Hotelkeeper Magazine. The two men continued to open restaurants in London, including Mezzo, The Orrery (with chef Chris Galvin) and the Bluebird complex, until Kissin left London in late 1997 to open Guastavino's in New York. The Kissin and Conran partnership ended in 2002.

Property development

From 2002 to 2010 Kissin developed residential property in New York City and East Hampton, NY. This included a 6,000 square foot brownstone on the Upper West side, a 2,600 square foot penthouse on Fifth Avenue complete with 2,500 square feet of terraces, and a 11,500 square foot mansion on two landscaped acres in East Hampton.

Latest project
Noted as 'one of the most influential restaurateurs in Britain'  Kissin returned to London to launch Boulestin, inspired by French restaurateur, author and pioneering TV presenter, Xavier Marcel Boulestin, whose eponymous Covent Garden restaurant opened in 1927 and who was the world's first TV chef on the BBC from 1937 to 1939.

The new Boulestin opened on St James's Street on 2 September 2013. It comprises a 90-seat (plus outside seating) restaurant and a private dining room. Boulestin specialises in serving mostly classic French cuisine, with dishes including Soupe de Poissons, Jambon Persillé and Oeuf en Gelée plus less classic dishes such as Scallops with Grilled Octopus and Baby Fennel and Venison Loin with Crab Apples and Smoked Chestnuts.

Within weeks of opening, the restaurant received high praise from food critics.

Describing it as "bang on trend", The Guardian's Jay Rayner asserted that "Marcel Boulestin would have loved his namesake restaurant... the new Boulestin hits the mark," before going on to laud the tête de veau – "done brilliantly" – and "a brace of perfectly cooked quail."

Writing in the Evening Standard, Fay Maschler singled out the "Oeuf en gelée rendered spectacular by the sunset yolk of a Cotswold Legbar egg," whilst Time Out's Guy Dimond was delighted that "rather than trying to impersonate an old master, this Boulestin is a sensitively updated reproduction," before commenting that "classic French cooking at its best shines in dishes such as daube of beef, which was slow-cooked and wonderfully tender."

Stephen Bayley, the esteemed author, critic, columnist, consultant, broadcaster, debater and curator concludes his experience with "there's nowhere in the area I would rather eat.”

Zoe Williams, restaurant critic from the Telegraph, describes the restaurant as, "the kind of place that makes you feel like a success; like a person who has gone back to the 1930s, when ceilings were high, fittings were brass and rooms were gorgeous.", whilst AA Gill from the Times stated "The Daube de Boeuf was the best I have had in a long time" and "The food was pretty damn formidable!"

Boulestin was sold in February 2018.

Kissin was a board member of the Restaurant Association of Great Britain (RAGB) in the 1990s and was also a board member of the New York Chapter of the National Restaurant Association (NRA). He is now an advisory board member of the Restaurant Association division of the BHA in the UK.

Former projects

Restaurant's owned, managed or opened by Joel Kissin and Sir Terence Conran:

Bibendum, Modern British, 1987
 
Blueprint Café, Modern British, 1989 
 
Le Pont de la Tour, Modern European, 1991
 
Cantina del Ponte, Mediterranean, 1992
 
Quaglino's, Modern European, 1993
 
Butlers Wharf Chop House, British, 1993
 
Mezzo, Modern European, 1995

Bluebird, Modern European, 1997

Zinc Bar and Grill – Opened in 1997

The Orrery – Modern European – opened in 1997
 
Guastavino's NY, American, 2000

References

External links
 

British restaurateurs
Living people
Year of birth missing (living people)